Mount Bielawski or Mount Bielewski (with an e instead of an a) is located in the Santa Cruz Mountains  of California, near the San Francisco Bay Area. The mountain reaches an elevation of  just to the southwest of the Santa Cruz – Santa Clara county line and Highway 35.
It is the highest point in Santa Cruz County.  Some snow falls on the mountain during winter.

The mountain is named for Casimir Bielawski who was a chief draughtsman of the Surveyor General's office.
It has, also, been called Mount McPherson.
Duncan Mc Pherson owned  at the top of the mountain in the 1930s and 1940s.

See also 
 List of highest points in California by county

References 

Mountains of Santa Clara County, California
Mountains of Santa Cruz County, California
Santa Cruz Mountains
Mountains of the San Francisco Bay Area
Mountains of Northern California